The 1888 Georgetown football team represented the Georgetown University during the 1888 college football season.  Georgetown finished the season with a 4–2 record.  This season included the first match against a semi-pro team, and the first time that Georgetown played an opponent that was not a local high school.  The game against Jefferson Athletic Club was won by forfeit.

Schedule

References

Georgetown
Georgetown Hoyas football seasons
Georgetown football